Peter Lassen (born 4 October 1966) is a Danish former football striker, who was the top goalscorer of the 1999–2000 Danish Superliga. He most notably played for Danish clubs Hvidovre IF, BK Frem, Akademisk Boldklub and Silkeborg IF, as well as Eendracht Aalst in Belgium.

External links

 Boldklubben Frem profile
 Silkeborg IF profile

1966 births
Living people
Danish men's footballers
Danish expatriate men's footballers
Boldklubben Frem players
Silkeborg IF players
Akademisk Boldklub players
S.C. Eendracht Aalst players
Danish Superliga players
Danish 1st Division players
Expatriate footballers in Belgium
Association football forwards
Footballers from Copenhagen